Óscar Zolezzi (4 February 1925 – 30 June 2019) was an Argentine rower. He competed in the men's coxless four event at the 1948 Summer Olympics.

References

External links
 

1925 births
2019 deaths
Argentine male rowers
Olympic rowers of Argentina
Rowers at the 1948 Summer Olympics
Place of birth missing